Mohinder Singh    (1852-1876) was the Maharaja of Patiala from 1862 to 1876.

Life
Mohinder Singh was the son of Narinder Singh, Maharaja of the State of Patiala. He was a member of the Phulkian Dynasty and succeeded to the throne in 1862 while still a child, so a council of regency ran the state government until he came of age in 1870. The project of the Sirhind Canal was sanctioned and completed during his reign , the State contributing one crore and twenty lakhs, as its share towards the cost of its construction. Mohindra College was founded and endowed with a palatial building, for the promotion of higher education, which was given free. The telegraph line between Patiala and Ambala was also constructed during this reign.  In the 1870 Birthday Honours, he was appointed a Knight Grand Commander of the Order of the Star of India.

Dying in 1876, Mohinder Singh was succeeded as Maharaja by his young son Rajinder Singh (born 1872).

References

1852 births
1876 deaths
Knights Grand Commander of the Order of the Star of India
Maharajas of Patiala
Punjabi people